Steve Babaeko (born June 1, 1971, Kaduna) is a Nigerian advertising and music executive, public advocate, founder of X3M Ideas, a Lagos-based digital advertising agency that was listed in 2017 as "one of Nigeria’s fastest growing communication agencies. He is also the founder/CEO of X3M Music, a record label that has as its marquee act, among others, Nigerian singer-songwriter Simi. He was on the 2018 jury of the New York Advertising Festival.

Biography and work 
Babaeko attended the Federal School of Arts and Science in Suleja, Niger State for his A-levels, and Ahmadu Bello University, Zaria for his first degree in Theatre Arts though he said he had always wanted to be in advertising. He did his mandatory National Youth Service (NYSC) at NTA Kaduna.

He began his career in 1995 with MC&A Saatchi & Saatchi where he worked for five years; then to Prima Garnet Ogilvy (agency), where he also worked for another five years; and 141 Worldwide, where he worked for seven years as creative director. He left in 2012 to set up X3M Ideas.

Babaeko is currently the Publicity Secretary of the Association of Advertising Agencies of Nigeria (AAAN), Associate member of Advertising Practitioners Council of Nigeria (APCON), and current Chairman of the Lagos Advertising & Ideas Festival (LAIF).

In August 2012, Babaeko founded X3M Ideas as "a full fledged advertising company" He also founded X3M Music, a record label, which has Praiz and Simi as its prominent stars. He says he founded X3M Ideas with "a pretty small team of about 8 persons" after he turned 40 and "started seeing the world from a totally different perspective." The company, which now has a staff of over a hundred people, moved to its purpose-built office complex in Lagos in 2016.

Juror on Advertising Festivals 
In 2016 and 2017, Babaeko was a jury member of the New York Advertising Festival, described as "one of the oldest advertising festivals in the world." He has also been invited as a Jury member to the 2018 event.

He was also a judge on the 2017 The Loerie Awards

Advocacy for Obangogo Hills for UNESCO Heritage 
Babaeko is involved in a couple of social advocacy activities, including pushing for the recognition of Obangogo Hills, a symbolic cultural and tourist location in Kogi State of Nigeria, standing over 700 metres high, as a UNESCO World Heritage Site.

Meaning of last name 
His last name, Babaeko, was given to his grandfather by his great-grandfather to honour a Lagos-based lawyer whose presence in Kabba at an auspicious time helped him win an important court case. Babaeko means "father from Lagos".

Personal life 
Since 2006, Babaeko has been married to photographer Yetunde Ayeni Babaeko.

References 

1971 births
Living people
Ahmadu Bello University alumni
Nigerian music industry executives